Ekenäs Church (Swedish: Ekenäs kyrka, Finnish: Tammisaaren kirkko) is a 17th century neoclassical stone church located in Ekenäs in the Finnish town of Raseborg. The construction of the church was started in 1651 and carried out to the 1670s. The initiative to build a stone church in Ekenäs came from earl Gustaf Adolf Leijonhufvud but it is unknown who designed the original baroque church.

Ekenäs Church was ravaged by fire in 1821 and renovated by architect Charles Bassi between 1839 and 1842. The appearance of the church we see nowadays is designed by Bassi. There are seats for 560 people in Ekenäs Church.

Ekenäs Church is used by the Swedish-speaking parish of Ekenäs (Ekenäsnejdens svenska församling) which is part of Diocese of Borgå in the Evangelical Lutheran Church of Finland.

History 
In 1546 king Gustav Vasa of Sweden grants Ekenäs a right to become a town.

In 1589 earl Axel Leijonhufvud starts constructing a small wooden church in Ekenäs.

In 1600 Axel Leijonhufvud's younger brother Moritz Leijonhufvud completes the construction of the wooden church. Interest towards a stone church raises during the 17th century.

In 1651 the construction of a stone church starts by the initiative of earl Gustaf Adolf Leijonhufvud. A memorial plate depicting earl Leijonhufvud and his wife Christina Catharina la Gardie is still to be seen on the outer wall of the church.

In 1651 earl Leijonhufvud dies due to the wounds he got during the Thirty Years' War.

In 1680 earl Leijonhufvud's son Gustav Mauritz Leijonhufvud completes the construction of Ekenäs stone church according to his father's will. The new church is built of granit, 36 meters long and 17 meters wide with walls 2 meters thick and a 31 meters high bell tower.

In 1690 the old wooden church is demolished.

In the 14th of June in 1821 about at 4 am Ekenäs church catches fire which even reaches the wooden roof of the church. Only the altar piece and some items were saved from the fire. The church was rebuild after the fire according to Charles Bassi's plans in neoclassical style. The rebuilding was completed by Anders Fredrik Granstedt. The new roof of Ekenäs church became 10 meters lower than the original, pilars inside were removed and new larger windows were opened.

In 1842 rebuilding of Ekenäs church is completed. The old baroque church represents now neoclassicism.

In 1957-1959 The stained glass windows by Karin Mazeitti-Slotte are moved to the northern side of the church. The windows were painted in 1924.

In 1987-1990 the church is restored and renovated. One of the stained glass windows is moved to the southern choir, the altar wall is masoned again and marmored. The tower of Ekenäs church is now 41,5 meters above the sea level and 35,8 meters over the ground.

Inventory 
One of the oldest objects of the church include a Bible which belonged to vicar Sigfridus Aronus Forsius. He was the vicar of Ekenäs in 1621-1624. The bible was rescued from fire and is now located in Ekenäs Museum.

Another pieces of 17th century inventory include vessels for the Holy Communion from the year 1613 and the altar piece which was made in Stockholm around 1660. The paintings of the altar piece are younger though. They were commissioned in Stockholm in 1797 and painted by professor Lorens Pasch the younger. The paintings represent the Holy Trinity of God and the sorrow of Christ.

The pulpit in Ekenäs Church is designed by A. F. Granstedt.

On the wall of the church is a memorial plate for the vicar Forsius.

Organ inside Ekenäs Church was built by Anders Thulé and donated to the church in 1842 by knight Berndt Erik Inberg. Since then it has been renovated a number of times. The latest restoration was completed in 1992.

References 

Raseborg
Neoclassical church buildings in Finland
Lutheran churches in Finland
17th-century Lutheran churches